Stegnogramma is a genus of ferns in the subfamily Thelypteridoideae of the family Thelypteridaceae in the Pteridophyte Phylogeny Group classification of 2016 (PPG I). Other sources sink Stegnogramma into a very broadly defined genus Thelypteris.

Species
, the Checklist of Ferns and Lycophytes of the World accepted the following species:

Stegnogramma amabilis (Tagawa) Nakaike
Stegnogramma aspidioides Blume
Stegnogramma burksiorum (J.E.Watkins & Farrar) Weakley
Stegnogramma calcicola Co
Stegnogramma celebica (Ching) Holttum
Stegnogramma centrochinensis (Ching ex Y.X.Lin) comb. ined.
Stegnogramma crenata Holttum
Stegnogramma cyrtomioides (C.Chr.) Ching
Stegnogramma dictyoclinoides Ching
Stegnogramma dissitifolia Holttum
Stegnogramma griffithii (T.Moore) K.Iwats.
Stegnogramma gymnocarpa (Copel.) K.Iwats.
Stegnogramma huishuiensis (Ching ex Y.X.Lin) comb. ined.
Stegnogramma intermedia (Ching ex Y.X.Lin) comb. ined.
Stegnogramma jinfoshanensis Ching & Z.Y.Liu
Stegnogramma leptogrammoides K.Iwats.
Stegnogramma mingchegensis (Ching) X.C.Zhang & L.J.He
Stegnogramma mollissima (Fisch. ex Kunze) Fraser-Jenk.
Stegnogramma pilosa (M.Martens & Galeotti) K.Iwats.
Stegnogramma pozoi (Lag.) K.Iwats.
Stegnogramma sagittifolia (Ching) L.J.He & X.C.Zhang
Stegnogramma scallanii (Christ) K.Iwats.
Stegnogramma sinensis (Ching & W.M.Chu) L.J.He & X.C.Zhang
Stegnogramma sinica (Ching ex Y.X.Lin) comb. ined.
Stegnogramma stegnogrammopsis (C.F.Reed) comb. ined.
Stegnogramma subcalcarata (Alderw.) Holttum
Stegnogramma tottoides (H.Itô) K.Iwats.
Stegnogramma wilfordii (Hook.) Seriz.
Stegnogramma xingwenensis Ching ex Y.X.Lin
Stegnogramma yahanensis (Ching ex Y.X.Lin) comb. ined.

References 

Thelypteridaceae
Fern genera